Fear of the dark is a common fear or phobia among children and, to a varying degree, adults. A fear of the dark does not always concern darkness itself; it can also be a fear of possible or imagined dangers concealed by darkness. Some degree of fear of the dark is natural, especially as a phase of child development. Most observers report that fear of the dark seldom appears before the age of two years. When fear of the dark reaches a degree that is severe enough to be considered pathological, it is sometimes called scotophobia (from  – "darkness"), or lygophobia (from  – "twilight").

Some researchers, beginning with Sigmund Freud, consider the fear of the dark to be a manifestation of separation anxiety disorder.

An alternate theory was posited in the 1960s, when scientists conducted experiments in a search for molecules responsible for memory. In one experiment, rats, normally nocturnal animals, were conditioned to fear the dark and a substance called "scotophobin" was supposedly extracted from the rats' brains; this substance was claimed to be responsible for remembering this fear. These findings were subsequently debunked.

Nyctophobia 
Nyctophobia (or Noctophobia) is a phobia characterized by a severe fear of the night. It is triggered by the brain's disfigured perception of what would, or could, happen when in a night-time environment. It can also be temporarily triggered if the mind is unsteady or scared about recent events or ideas, or a partaking in content the brain considers a threat (examples could include indulging in horror content, witnessing vulgar actions, or having linked dark environments to prior events or ideas that disturb the mind). Normally, since humans are not nocturnal by nature, they are usually a bit more cautious or alert at night than in the day, since the dark is a vastly different environment. Nyctophobia produces symptoms beyond the normal instinctive parameters, such as breathlessness, excessive sweating, nausea, dry mouth, feeling sick, shaking, heart palpitations, inability to speak or think clearly or sensation of detachment from reality and death. Nyctophobia can be severely detrimental physically and mentally if these symptoms are not resolved. There are many types of therapies to help manage Nyctophobia.

Nyctophobia may also be tied to nocturnal creatures, whether fictional or real. For instance someone who experiences Sanguivoriphobia, a fear of vampires, might also experience Nyctophobia due to an association with vampires. Or someone with Chiroptophobia, or fear of bats, might also likewise have Nyctophobia due to their association with the night or dark spaces.

Exposure therapy can be very effective when exposing the person to darkness. With this method a therapist can help with relaxation strategies such as meditation. Another form of therapy is Cognitive Behavioral Therapy. Therapists can help guide patients with behavior routines that are performed daily and nightly to reduce the symptoms associated with Nyctophobia. In severe cases, anti-depressants and anti-anxiety medication drugs can be effective to those dealing with symptoms that may not be manageable if therapy could not reduce the symptoms of Nyctophobia.

Despite its pervasive nature, there has been a lack of etiological research on the subject. Nyctophobia is generally observed in children but, according to J. Adrian Williams' article "Indirect Hypnotic Therapy of Nyctophobia: A Case Report", many clinics with pediatric patients have a great chance of having adults who have nyctophobia. The same article states that "the phobia has been known to be extremely disruptive to adult patients and... incapacitating".

Scotophobia 

Although not clinically recognised, scotophobia has gained traction in social circles, it is often described as a more vague version of Nyctophobia, being ascribed only to darkness or dark spaces. Those suffering from scotophobia might fear dark basements, tunnels, forests, rooms or other spaces without light. 

See also 
List of phobias
Fear of ghosts

References 

Darkness
Phobias